Eike Wilm Schulte (born 13 October 1939) is a German operatic baritone. A member of the Hessisches Staatstheater Wiesbaden, from 1988 the Bayerische Staatsoper, he made an international career, singing more than 100 parts at major opera houses such as the Metropolitan Opera, and at festivals including the Bayreuth Festival. He participated in several premieres of contemporary opera.

Career 

Schulte was born in Plettenberg, Westphalia. He studied voice at the Musikhochschule Köln, with Josef Metternich among others. He made his debut on stage at the Deutsche Oper am Rhein in 1966 as Sid in Benjamin Britten's Albert Herring. From 1969, Schulte was a member of the Theater Bielefeld, where he appeared as Papageno in Mozart's Die Zauberflöte, as Germont in La Traviata and in the leading part Alfred Ill in Gottfried von Einem's Der Besuch der alten Dame, opposite Martha Mödl in the title role. From 1973 to 1988 Schulte was a member of the Hessisches Staatstheater Wiesbaden, where he sang major baritone parts, from Mozart (Guglielmo in Così fan tutte) to Wagner (Telramund in Lohengrin), Marcel in Puccini's La Bohème, Lindorf, Coppelius, Dapertutto and Mirakel in Hoffmanns Erzählungen, alongside Hermin Esser in the title role, Elizabeth Parcells as Olympia and Gail Gilmore as Niklaus, and the pharao in Rossini's Mosè, with Nadine Secunde. He performed contemporary operas such as premieres by Volker David Kirchner. From 1988 he has been a member of the Bayerische Staatsoper. During his career, he sang more than a hundred different parts.

Schulte appeared as a guest at the Metropolitan Opera, the Teatro La Fenice, the Gran Teatre del Liceu, among others.

He performed at the Bayreuth Festival, beginning in 1988 as the Heerrufer (The King's Herald) in Lohengrin, from 1992 as Wolfram von Eschenbach in Tannhäuser, and in 1998 he stepped in as Gunther in Götterdämmerung, singing but not acting.

Throughout his career, he took part in contemporary opera, including premieres. In 1969, he sang in the premiere of Giselher Klebe's Das Märchen von der schönen Lilie at the Schwetzingen Festival in the Schlosstheater Schwetzingen. He appeared in operas by Volker David Kirchner, as Henrik in Die Trauung in Wiesbaden in 1974, as Babel in Die fünf Minuten des Isaak Babel in Wuppertal in 1980, and as Ezechiel in Das kalte Herz in Wiesbaden in 1981.

Schulte has appeared in recitals and concerts.

He can be seen on video as the Heerrufer and as Beckmesser.

Awards 

Schulte is honorary member of the Hessisches Staatstheater. In 2008, he received the Goethe-Plakette des Landes Hessen, the highest award of the Hessian Ministry for Science and the Arts.

Sources 
 Karl J. Kutsch and Leo Riemens: Großes Sängerlexikon. Third edition. Munich 1999. Volume 4: Moffo–Seidel, pp. 3164/3165.

References

External links 
 Eike Wilm Schulte Official website
 
 
 
 Eike Wilm Schulte operabase.com
 Eike Wilm Schulte medici.tv
 Daniel Honsack: Der Bariton Eike Wilm Schulte über das Singen Wiesbaden Kultur 26 March 2008 

 Singing LOHENGRIN on YouTube
 "Ode to Joy" on YouTube
 Trying to sing a serenade, and encountering difficulties (YouTube)

German operatic baritones
1939 births
Living people
People from Plettenberg